The 1983 Yugoslavian motorcycle Grand Prix was the seventh round of the 1983 Grand Prix motorcycle racing season. It took place on the weekend of 10–12 June 1983 at the Automotodrom Rijeka.

Classification

500 cc

References

Yugoslav motorcycle Grand Prix
Yugoslavian
Motorcycle Grand Prix
Yugoslavian motorcycle Grand Prix